Evelyn Cunningham (January 25, 1916 – April 28, 2010) was an American journalist and aide to Nelson Rockefeller. Cunningham covered the early civil rights movement and was a reporter and editor for the Pittsburgh Courier. She and the paper's staff were awarded the George Polk Award in 1998 for their coverage.

Early life

Evelyn Cunningham was born Evelyn Elizabeth Long in Elizabeth City, North Carolina, one of two children of a taxicab driver and a dressmaker. The family moved to New York City when Evelyn was a child; she was educated in city schools and graduated from Hunter College High School in 1934 and from Long Island University in 1943, earning a bachelor's degree.

Pittsburgh Courier
The largest black newsweekly at the time, the Pittsburgh Courier was an influential presence during and in the years preceding the civil rights movement. Cunningham joined the Courier in 1940 working from the Harlem office at 125th street. She earned the nickname the "lynching editor" due to her extensive coverage of lynchings in the deep south. While at the Courier she attempted to interview Bull Connor, in Birmingham, Alabama, but he denied her, with a racial epithet.

She also met with a number of civil rights leaders, including Martin Luther King Jr. and Malcolm X. Cunningham wrote a three-part series on the King family from those meetings.  She often worked with Thurgood Marshall, covering the cases he defended. One evening, an after hours club they were attending in Harlem was raided. "[She] accosted a cop she knew, telling him, "You can't arrest this man. He is very, very important, he's with the NAACP, you've got to let him go." King,  Devil in the Grove, pg. 41.

Work as political aide; later career
After leaving the Courier, in 1962, Cunningham hosted a radio show of her own on WLIB in New York. She then joined Nelson Rockefeller in 1965 as a special assistant to the then governor. She maintained this title in Washington during his vice presidency. She also served on Nixon's Task Force on Women's Rights and Responsibilities.

In 1970, Cunningham was one of the founders of the New York Coalition of One Hundred Black Women, a non-profit organization dedicated to bettering the lives of black women "and their families through implementing initiatives and services to address important social, political, economical [and] cultural issues."

In the 2000s, Cunningham was appointed to the New York City Commission on Women's Issues by Michael Bloomberg.

Personal life
Tall—almost six feet tall in heels—and with red hair, Cunningham was called "Big East," referring both to her height and her New York City background. A dedicated career woman who once expressed the opinion that "marriage isn't much good for a career woman", nevertheless she  married four times. Her last marriage was to Austin H. Brown, who died in 2003. A Juilliard-trained pianist, he was also the first African-American master watchmaker in New York's Diamond District.

She had one brother, Clyde Whitehurst Long, who died in 1973, leaving a daughter, whom Evelyn raised. She also had two step-daughters from Austin's previous marriage, which also gave her two grandchildren.

References

External links
A Few Good Women... Evelyn Cunningham
Evelyn Cunningham National Visionary

1916 births
2010 deaths
People from Elizabeth City, North Carolina
African-American journalists
American women journalists
African-American women writers
African-American writers
Long Island University alumni
American women non-fiction writers
20th-century African-American people
21st-century African-American people
20th-century African-American women
21st-century African-American women